Ålder okänd (translates to Age Unknown) is a 1991 TV-movie written and directed by Richard Hobert. The movie was shown on Swedish TV2 in three parts of 50 minutes each.

Plot 
A scientist discovers what he believes to be a way of slowing down the aging process, and has started to administer the substance to select people.

Cast 
 Harriet Andersson as Marianne Retke
 Christian Fiedler as Max Hoffman
 Henri Garcin as François Monet
 Lars Humble as Kurt Retke
 Patricia Lawrence as Barbara Heynes
 Sven Lindberg as Dahlberg
 Evert Lindkvist as Flygvapenchefen
 Lars Passgård as Actor
 Kajsa Reingardt as Katarina Retke
 Göran Stangertz as Business lawyer
 Eva-Britt Strandberg as Christina Lind
 Sven-Bertil Taube as Peter Wall
 Jan Tiselius as Borelius
 Thomas Ungewitter as Doctor

External links 
Entry at Svensk filmdatabas (in Swedish)
 

1991 television films
1991 films
1990s science fiction drama films
Swedish television films
1990s Swedish-language films
Swedish science fiction drama films
Films directed by Richard Hobert
1990s Swedish films